Pavol Bojanovský (born 6 September 1953) is a Slovak basketball player. He competed in the men's tournament at the 1980 Summer Olympics.

References

External links
 

1953 births
Living people
Czechoslovak men's basketball players
Olympic basketball players of Czechoslovakia
Basketball players at the 1980 Summer Olympics
Sportspeople from Bratislava
1978 FIBA World Championship players
Slovak men's basketball players